Thrive may refer to:

Thriving

Music 
Thrive (Newsboys album), a 2002 Christian rock album
Thrive (Casting Crowns album), a 2014 Christian rock album
Thrive Records, an independent electronic music label

Other uses 
Thrive (film), 2015 short documentary film about Matthew Whitaker
Thrive (website), a personal finance website
Toshiba Thrive, a tablet computer
Thrive Global, an American consulting company founded by Arianna Huffington
Thrive: The Third Metric to Redefining Success and Creating a Life of Well-Being, Wisdom, and Wonder, book by Arianna Huffington
Thrive Market, American e-commerce food retailer

See also